The One Ton Cup is a trophy presented to the winner of a sailing competition created in 1899 by the Cercle de la voile de Paris (CVP).

Synopsis

The One Ton Cup regattas were at the beginning of races between one-tonner sailing dinghies, according to the 1899 Godinet rule. This Coupe internationale du Cercle de la voile de Paris, its original name, was raced from 1907 until 1962 on boats that measured the International gaff-rigged
6 Metre rule, except for four years, from 1920 to 1923, where it was raced on 6.5m SI. In 1965, after three years vacant, the One Ton Cup was transformed into a scope suitable for ocean racing on the initiative of Jean Peytel, member of the CVP, following the activity slowdown of the 6m JI class. The One Ton Cup was then raced according to the RORC rule on 22 feet boats, and on IOR rule on 27.5 feet boats from 1971, followed by IOR rule 30.5 feet in 1984. In 1999, the One Ton Cup was allotted to the Corel 45 class world championship, renamed IC 45, a one-design boat designed by Bruce Farr. In 2016 the Cup was allocated to the FAST40+ Class for a regatta to be sailed in the Solent from September 16 to 18.

History 

Mr Mantois, vice-president of the Cercle de la voile de Paris, announced the creation of the International One Ton Cup on 11 October 1898. It had to be raced on the Seine River at Meulan, home of the CVP or in Cowes if owned by a foreigner. The yachts had to have a tonnage certificate of one ton at the most according to the Godinet rule of 1892.

The silver cup 
The cup was designed in 1897 by the jeweller Robert Linzeler and was made by Bratiau in 1898. It is made of planished solid silver and weighs 10 kilos. The lot is 58 centimetres wide (81 with the handles) and 57 centimetres high. Placed on an ebony plinth, it is considered as a masterpiece of Art nouveau style.

The first Godinet rule One Ton Cups 

These one-tonners are dinghies measuring up to 7 metres, capable of planing in certain conditions and built with a scantling as light as possible, the balance being ensured by the crew. These yachts were also present at the 1900 Olympic Games, in the 0.5 to 1 tonner class.

The first Cup took place from 2 May 1899 in Meulan. The English competitor Vectis was beaten by the French yacht Bélouga steered by Eugène Laverne during the three timed rounds. Bélouga had the advantage of knowing the river and had been capped among nine French one-tonners specifically built for this event.
In 1900, Scotia 1, designed by Linton Hope faced Sidi-Fekkar steered and designed by Eugène Laverne. Sidi-Fekkar won the Cup at the end of the decisive fifth round. But Scotia won the gold medal at the Olympics.

Scotia 2 from the Sea View Yacht-Club won the Cup in England in 1901. One of the reasons of the French failure was the switch in 1901 from the 1892 rule to the Méran formula; the one-tonner Sidi-Fekkar weighed close to two tons according to this 1901 rule and had to be changed3. Sequana, the defender yacht chosen by the CVP in 1901, steered by Eugène Laverne was beaten, as well as the Italian yacht Dai-Dai.
In 1902, Scotia III won in three rounds against August steered by Valton, member of the CVP, still for the SVYC. France won the Cup back in 1903 with Chocolat, Auguste Godinet’s plan, at the origin of the 1892 rule. Valton, Méran and Arthus won against the defender Iris.
In 1906, after two years without challenge, the last Cup played on a French rule one-tonner was won by Feu Follet with Louis Potheau of the CVP in front of N.R.V. from Hamburg.

The era of international 6 Metre 

From 1907 the CVP decided to have this One Ton Cup contested in international 6-metre yachts, a brand-new rule ratified by the representatives of the European Nautical Authorities during the London congress in 1906. They were not 6 to 7-metre dinghies anymore but keelboats of about eleven metres hull length that confronted each other during regattas that continued to bear the name of one-tonners cup or One Ton Cup. Onkel Adolf for Germany won the first Cup on 6 Metre in 1907.

In 1913, the 6 Metre Cremona of the Royal Thames Yacht Club won the last Cup before the First World War.
After an interlude of four Cups contested in 6.5m SI, the CVP decided in 1923 to come back to international 6 Metre, at the British challengers’ request5.

The era of 6.50mSI 

From 1920 to 1923 four cups were contested in 6.5m SI at the CVP’s request. The 6.50m of the French rule known as « Chemin de fer » rule, adopted in Continental Europe since the yachts could be carried on standard flat wagons, favoured the number of challengers.
The English defender 6.50m Cordella won the Cup four times. It was a plan by Morgan Giles that was opposed among others to Oranje, gold medal for the Netherlands in 6.50m at the 1920 Olympics.

The era of the ocean race and One-tonner 

The 6 Metre series, back in 1924, was in decline after 1945. At the beginning of the 1960s, Jean Peytel, member of the Cercle de la voile de Paris suggested to revive the CVP International Cup in RORC rule 22 feet maximum yacht. The boats were baptized as the One Ton class. Yachting World magazine documented the excitement this caused amongst sailors: "Seldom can a trophy have created so much interest before a single race has been sailed" in January 1965, and in September of that year the magazine wrote that "Handicaps are out and the popularity of the series has exceeded all expectations, even in this its first year."

The first One Ton Cup in racing-cruising yachts was raced off Le Havre in 1965 by fourteen yachts. The winner was the Danish yacht Diana III. The real-time racing formula, including a race on the open sea and two coastal regattas, was so successful that yachts were specifically designed for that event. They were named the One-tonners although this designation did not correspond any longer to any rule of that period.

In 1971 the IOR rule (International Offshore Rule), result of the merger between the RORC rule and the CCA (Cruising Club of America) American rule, came into force for the races on the open sea9,6. The One-Tonners switched to IOR 27.5 feet. Syd Fischer skipper of Stormy Petrel won the 1971 One Ton Cup in New Zealand (the first race under the IOR rules), being the only Australian yacht and last Sparkman & Stephens design to win the cup.   

In November 1983 the ORC (Offshore Racing Council, renamed Offshore Racing Congress in 2005) decided to bring the IOR rule of the One-Tonners up to 30.5, the smallest size for yachts accepted for the Admiral's Cup. The first One Ton Cup with that rule was contested by 24 yachts in 1984. Philippe Briand, architect and skipper of Passion 2 won in La Rochelle11, France.

In 1999 the world championship of the Corel 45 series (IC 45, Farr 45) was attributed to the One Ton Cup. The first Cup was won by Bertrand Pacé.

Winners

See also
Half Ton Cup

References

Art Nouveau works
Sailing competitions
Recurring sporting events established in 1899